The 1943 Boston College Eagles football team represented Boston College as an independent during the 1943 college football season. The Eagles were led by head coach Moody Sarno, who was in his first year covering for Denny Myers while Myers served in the United States Navy. Boston College played their home games at Alumni Field in Chestnut Hill, Massachusetts and Fenway Park in Boston.

College football in the Boston area was significantly disrupted by World War II, as many college players and coaches left school to serve the war effort. The only player for Boston College left from its 1943 Orange Bowl squad was captain Ed "The Brain" Doherty, who also assisted Moody Sarno in coaching duties. Playing a shortened schedule consisting mainly of teams from military bases, the Eagles finished the year unbeaten with a record of 4–0–1.

Schedule

References

Boston College
Boston College Eagles football seasons
College football undefeated seasons
Boston College Eagles football
1940s in Boston